Supreme Scream is a Turbo Drop amusement ride located at Knott's Berry Farm in Buena Park, CA.

The ride consists of three individual Turbo Drop model towers arranged in a triangular footprint; the three towers joined at their peaks by a  pyramidal crown and marquee.

Utilizing pneumatics paired with a pulley system, the ride carriages are then accelerated downward faster than a true free-fall to attain a top speed of —exposing riders to a maximum G-force of 4 and negative G-force of -1.

The ride’s tagline is "30 Stories Up. 3 Seconds Down."

History
Supreme Scream opened to the general public on July 3, 1998, as the tallest turbo drop–type amusement ride in the world. A soft opening for the attraction was held two days prior.

During its opening year, nearby local residents were complaining about the ride's noise. This was due to the screeching, scratching and rumbling sounds of punctuated blasts of air. To address the issue, S&S Worldwide and Knott's Berry Farm engineers would install 14-inch sound buffers in the ride's mechanics to muffle the screaming.

Records

References

External links
Official Supreme Scream page
Supreme Scream at Ultimate Roller Coaster

Knott's Berry Farm
Drop tower rides
Amusement rides manufactured by S&S – Sansei Technologies
Cedar Fair attractions
Amusement rides introduced in 1998